Bradfield College, formally St Andrew's College, Bradfield, is a public school (English fee-charging boarding and day school) for pupils aged 13–18, located in the small village of Bradfield in the English county of Berkshire. It is noted for producing plays in Ancient Greek and its open-air amphitheatre.

The school is a member of the Rugby Group, which also includes Rugby, Harrow, Shrewsbury, Wellington College and Charterhouse.

The college was founded in 1850 by Thomas Stevens, Rector and Lord of the Manor of Bradfield. It has around 490 male and 320 female pupils.

Overview
According to the Good Schools Guide, "Thoroughly unpretentious yet with lots to boast about, Bradfield is a heavenly place to learn and to grow. Very difficult to imagine who would not thrive here. There's something for everyone and lots for all."

The school, which admits pupils between the ages of 13–18, has been fully co-educational since September 2005. All first year pupils (Fourth Formers) enter a first year boarding house (Faulkner's) and then, from the second year (known as the Shell), they move to their main boarding houses for the remaining four years.

The school motto the Latin rendering of Psalm 119:12 Benedictus es, O Domine. Doce me Statuta Tua, which means "You are blessed, Lord. Teach me your Laws".

History
Bradfield College was founded in 1850 by Thomas Stevens. Stevens had inherited the parish from his father in 1842, having been in his family for four generations. As a tribute to his father, he set about restoring the church. Sir Gilbert Scott (one of whose architect sons, John Oldrid Scott, was later to marry Thomas Stevens's eldest daughter, Mary Anne) was commissioned to effect the restoration. It was decided that the majority of the church, except the tower, should be demolished and rebuilt in a style influenced by that of gothic architecture. After the completion of the church in 1848, Stevens saw it fit to arrange a choir. While the whole village were able to sing, they were not felt to be of a high enough standard. It was proposed that a college be established at Bradfield, to be called St Andrew's College. The college was to be for the education of a limited number of boys between the ages of 8 and 12, with all to be from modest backgrounds. Their education was to be based upon 'true Church principles', with focus to be paid on reading, writing, mathematics, and music, and later on, classics and history.

The first headmaster to be appointed was F. B. Guy in 1852. The headmaster was to be under control of the college Warden, who would be responsible for the principal governance of the college. Soon after the formal establishment of the college, all references to 'true Church principles' were dropped, with the focus now being on providing an education like that of other British Public Schools.

By 1880 there were eight masters and 75 boys (far fewer than the founder's aim of 300); creditors were petitioning for the school's bankruptcy given debts of £160,000; by 1900 there were 292 students, making the school more financially viable.

The Greek play
Bradfield is renowned for its Greek plays and outdoor amphitheatre. The first Greek play, Alcestis, was performed in the original language in 1881. The play was put on by Headmaster, Herbert Branston Gray to save the school from bankruptcy and was inspired by the performance of Agamemnon at Balliol College, Oxford in 1880, directed by F. R. Benson, who stage-managed the Bradfield performance and took the role of Apollo.

The Greek play is normally performed on a three-year rota.  The students who act in them receive no formal training in speaking Ancient Greek, and have only nine months to learn the lines and direction, while keeping up with their other studies.

The amphitheatre was based on that at Epidaurus and built in a disused chalk pit. It opened in 1890 with a performance of Antigone. The 2006 play, Euripides’s Medea, directed by John Taylor, was noted for including the addition of projected surtitles and incorporating the orchestra into the skēnē, using a ramp covered in sand and flooded to symbolise the sea and Medea's situation of being "between places".

The amphitheatre was closed in 2009 due to its poor state of repair, especially the temple building.  Following a £1.3 million appeal, the amphitheatre was restored and reopened with a performance of Antigone on 20 June 2014. The College decided not to rebuild the Victorian temple at the rear of the performing area because such "temples" are not true to the design of ancient Greek amphitheatres. The smaller skēnē creates space, making the performance of the plays easier and better enabling the theatre to be used for other drama including Shakespeare.

Headmasters

1852 F. B. Guy

??

1868–1869 Henry Hayman

1869–1872 J. S. Hodson

1872–1877 F. A. Souper

1877–1880 Charles Thomas Crutwell

1880–1910 Herbert Branston Gray

1910–1919 Harold Costley-White

??–??S. P. Denning

??–?? R. E. Sanderson (10 years)

1928-1950 Eric Edward Allen Whitworth

1950-1957 John D. Hills

1957–1963 Anthony Chenevix-Trench

1964–1971 Michael Hoban

1971-1985 Anthony Oliver Herbert Quick

1985-2003 Peter B. Smith

2003-2011 Peter J.M. Roberts

2011–2015 Simon Henderson

2015–present Christopher Stevens

Current head master 
Dr Christopher Stevens succeeded Simon Henderson as Headmaster in September 2015. Stevens was educated at Tonbridge School and then read Modern and Medieval Languages at Cambridge University, from where he received his MA. He began his teaching career as a college lecturer while researching for a DPhil in Italian literature at Oxford University. He then established a school in France for Ashdown House, the boarding prep school in Sussex. He joined Uppingham School in 1997 where he was master-in-charge of cricket and a housemaster for nine years. In 2011 he moved to Marlborough College, and was Second Master until his appointment at Bradfield.

Other information
In September 2010 the Blackburn Science Centre was opened. The building includes green elements such as a bio-mass boiler, green roof and solar panels.

Since September 2012 Bradfield has offered the International Baccalaureate Diploma Programme (IBDP) alongside the traditional A Level pathway.

In Summer 2015 Bradfield received an outstanding inspection report from the Independent Schools Inspectorate.

The oldest building is College gateway, which incorporates part of a barn of 1382. The wrought iron was made by the village blacksmith.

In September 2021 the College announced that it had acquired the neighbouring St. Andrew's Church after the building had fallen into disrepair. It is in the process of being converted into a secondary library and working space.

Each August, the college serves as the 'base camp' for the Bradfield Ringing Course, which aims to improve the standard of change-ringing in the United Kingdom.

Houses
Bradfield has 12 boarding houses in total. All first years pupils (Fourth Formers) enter a first year boarding house (Faulkner's) and then, from the second year (known as the Shell), they move to their main boarding houses for the remaining four years.

Old Bradfieldians

Notable staff 
 Weston Bate, Australian historian
 Anthony Chenevix-Trench, headmaster 1955–1963, subsequently headmaster of Eton College and Fettes College
 Harold Costley-White, Anglican priest and headmaster, subsequently head of Westminster School
 Albert David (1867–1950) Anglican priest, schoolmaster and bishop
 Marshal of the Royal Air Force Charles Elworthy, Baron Elworthy, school governor
 Sir Ronald Aylmer Fisher (1890–1962) statistician, evolutionary biologist, geneticist, and eugenicist
 Herbert Branston Gray, headmaster from 1880 to 1910
 Ronald Groves, Master of Dulwich College from 1954 to 1966 
 John Harvey, cricket coach and groundsman
 Henry Hayman, headmaster from 1868 to 1869
 Simon Henderson, headmaster from 2011 to 2015
 Michael Hoban, headmaster 1964–1971, subsequently headmaster of Harrow School
 James Stephen Hodson DD FRSE (1816–1890) who had served as Rector of Edinburgh Academy from 1854 to 1869
 Henry Jollye (1841–1902), assistant master, first-class cricketer
 Peter Jones, Languages master and soccer coach
 Vinnie Jones, formerly worked in the college kitchens
 General Sir Peter Leng MC, British Army officer and Master-General of the Ordnance
 Bertram Luard-Selby (1853–1918), composer and cathedral organist
 Richard Osborne, English teacher and Army House Tutor.  Post-Bradfield career: Writer, broadcaster and music critic.
 Denis Richards, teacher and RAF historian.
 Major-General Michael Scott, (born 1941) is a British Army officer and former Military Secretary (United Kingdom).
 John Shaw (former field hockey player and coach)
Eva Ruth Spalding, composer and violin teacher
 Christopher Steel (1938–1991) British composer of contemporary classical music
 William Beach Thomas, later a war correspondent and writer on rural affairs
 Jonathan Saunders, English teacher and housemaster of Stone House
 Ann Schlee, an English novelist. She won the annual Guardian Children's Fiction Prize for The Vandal (1979)

See also 
Independent school (UK)
List of independent schools in the United Kingdom

References

External links

Bradfield College website
The Good Schools Guide review
Tatler Schools Guide review
The Bradfield Society website

Private schools in West Berkshire District
Member schools of the Headmasters' and Headmistresses' Conference
Boarding schools in Berkshire
International Baccalaureate schools in England

Educational institutions established in 1850
1850 establishments in England
Cricket grounds in Berkshire
Bradfield, Berkshire